Badsara is a small village based in the Tehsil “Bharari” of “Bilaspur” district in the state of Himachal Pradesh in India. Basically, it is a small rural village that is famous for its sightseeing sites. Badsara village has a Sarpanch which is also called (Head of Village). He is the one who manages all the administration. He gets elected by the representatives of the village.

Geography
Badsara village is sprawled in the area of 53.02 hectares. It has total 33 numbers of households. The village has a total population of 164 out of which 79 are males and 85 are females. In terms of population in the age-group 0–6, it has total 21 persons out of which 12 are males & 9 are females. This entire data was calculated during the Census of 2011.

Education rate
The total numbers of persons who are literates are 128. Out of 128, 65 are males and 63 are females.

Caste
10 numbers of individuals are Scheduled Caste in which 5 are males and 5 are females whereas no Scheduled Tribes are residing.

Demographic
The location code number of Badsara is 019171. Pin Code is 174028.

Transportation

The nearest road distance to public transport is approximate 19 km to Ghumarwin where you can take public buses. The nearest airport to reach here is-
 Shimla Airport, Shimla, Himachal Pradesh.
 Bhuntar Airport, Kullu, Himachal Pradesh.
 Gaggal Airport, Kangra, Himachal Pradesh.
 Chandigarh International Airport, Chandigarh, Mohali, Punjab.

References

Villages in Bilaspur district, Himachal Pradesh